Mifumi is a village in Kirewa sub-county, Tororo District, Uganda.

Mifumi village is based 35 km from Tororo town.  In order to get there you may take public transport of a shared minibus to Katande and then a hired bicycle (boda-boda) to Mifumi.

The village is the base for a development charity, MIFUMI. The Mifumi Primary School has a nursery section, 11 classrooms, Administration block and a community centre (which doubles as the local Church). It is supported by MIFUMI, an international aid and development agency. A Health Centre has been established as well as domestic violence advice centres.

External links
 MIFUMI

Tororo District
Populated places in Eastern Region, Uganda